American country artist Jean Shepard released twenty-five studio albums, fifteen compilation albums, one live album, seventy-one singles, two charting B-sides, and appeared on nine albums. Signing in 1952 with Capitol Records, her second single "A Dear John Letter" (a 1953 duet with Ferlin Husky) became a breakthrough hit. It topped the Billboard Hot Country Songs for six weeks and reached the Billboard Hot 100's fourth position. Shepard's solo career became successful in 1955 with the release several singles, including the top-five hits "A Satisfied Mind" and "Beautiful Lies". Shepard's debut studio album Songs of a Love Affair (1956) was the first country music "concept album" to be issued. She was commercially unsuccessful until a major comeback in 1964 with the top-five hit "Second Fiddle (To an Old Guitar)" and the studio album Lighthearted and Blue. The latter was her first to reach the Top Country Albums list. A series of hit singles continued for Shepard, such as "Many Happy Hangovers to You", "I'll Take the Dog", "If Teardrops Were Silver", and "Then He Touched Me". Accompanying albums reached the major positions on the country albums chart, including Many Happy Hangovers, Heart, We Did All That We Could, and Best by Request.

Shepard signed a new contract with United Artists Records in 1973 and debuted her single "Slippin' Away" the same year. It reached the fourth position of the Hot Country Songs chart and was a minor hit on the Hot 100 list. An album of the same name peaked at number fifteen on the Billboard country albums chart. Shepard followed-up the success until 1975 with top-twenty hits, including "At the Time", "Poor Sweet Baby", and "The Tip of My Fingers". The 1978 single "The Real Thing" was her final chart appearance, peaking in the eighty fifth position. Shepard has since released new material sporadically, such as the 1981 studio album Dear John.

Albums

Studio albums

Compilation albums

Live albums

Singles

As lead artist

As a collaborative artist

Other charted songs

Other appearances

Notes

References

External links 
 Jean Shepard discography at Discogs

Discographies of American artists
Country music discographies